Laura D. Taylor-Kale (pronounced KAH-Lay) (born July 10, 1977) is an American foreign policy and economic advisor. She is the Fellow for Innovation and Economic Competitiveness at the Council on Foreign Relations. In 2022 the Biden Administration nominated her to be the Assistant Secretary of Defense for Industrial Base Policy, a new position.

Early life 
Taylor-Kale was born and raised in Illinois to an African American mother and a Cameroonian immigrant father.

Career 
Taylor-Kale has worked in countries including India, Sri Lanka, Afghanistan, Senegal, Niger, Burkina Faso, Côte d’Ivoire, and Cameroon. From 2003 to 2012, Taylor-Kale was a career Foreign Service Officer in the United States Department of State, where she served in India, Côte d’Ivoire, Afghanistan, the Executive Board of the World Bank and International Finance Corporation, and the Department of State Bureau of Economic and Business Affairs. From 2012-2014, she was the special assistant to the vice president for sustainable development at the World Bank.

In 2014, Taylor-Kale joined the Obama administration at the U.S. International Development Finance Corporation as the senior advisor to the President and CEO for policy and operations. From 2016 to 2017, Taylor-Kale served as the deputy assistant secretary of commerce for manufacturing at the International Trade Administration in the U.S. Department of Commerce.

Since 2021, Taylor-Kale has been the Fellow for Innovation and Economic Competitiveness at the Council on Foreign Relations, where her research focuses on U.S. innovation policy, industrial policy, the future of work. She contributes to the Council's Renewing America Initiative. She is a life member of the Council on Foreign Relations.

Biden administration nomination
On May 26, 2022, President Joe Biden nominated Taylor-Kale to be an Assistant Secretary of Defense for Industrial Base Policy. Hearings on her nomination were held before the Senate Armed Services Committee on July 28, 2022. During that hearing, Senator Dan Sullivan announced he would be placing a hold on Taylor-Kale's nomination due to a disagreement with the Biden administration over a mining project in his home state of Alaska. The Senate Armed Services Committee approved Taylor-Kale's nomination in September 2022. In December 2022, Sullivan said he considered her qualified for the job but continued to block the full Senate vote. Taylor-Kale's nomination expired at the end of the year and was returned to President Biden on January 3, 2023.

President Biden renominated Taylor-Kale the same day. The Armed Services Committee favorably reported her nomination to the Senate floor on February 9, 2023. Her nomination is pending before the full United States Senate.

References 

Living people
1977 births